Kanan Mishra (1944–2015) was an Oriya writer.

Biography
Mishra was born on 1 January 1944 at Cuttack, Odisha. She wrote five novels, four collections of poetry, one English featured novel and seven children's stories. She was married. She died on 7 March 2015 at the age of 71.

Awards
For her translated book Suryamukhi ra Swapna she received the Sahitya Academy Award from the state government of Odisha.

References

1944 births
2015 deaths
Indian women poets
Odia-language poets
People from Cuttack